Roger William Jones (born 1948) is an English musician and composer of Church music. Alongside writing cantatas and hymn tunes he leads workshops and conducts performances of his works both around the UK and other countries.

Biography

Roger Jones was born in Birmingham on 15 May 1948, the son of Harold and Winifred Jones  and studied piano, organ, cello and general musicianship at the Birmingham School of Music.  After teacher training at City of Birmingham College of Education (now Birmingham City University Faculty of Education, Law and Social Sciences), in September 1969 he became Head of Music and then in September 1978 Head of Lower School at Aston Manor School (now Academy).

Writing songs for the pupils, his first musical, Jerusalem Joy, was performed at the school in 1973. Before giving up teaching in 1984 he wrote 5 more musicals: Apostle, David, A Grain of Mustard Seed about the Sunday School pioneer Robert Raikes, Saints Alive and Greater than Gold. Up to 2015, Roger Jones had composed a total of 23 musicals.

Since leaving teaching in 1984 he has worked full-time in Christian music, and is director of Christian Music Ministries, which publishes his works. A biography (Roger Jones Musical Man by Graham Allen) was published by Christian Music Ministries in 2015.

He currently hosts 'Heart and Soul' which is a regular two-hour weekly programme on Brumside Radio (formerly called South Birmingham Radio). In it he presents church music and chats to what are described by the internet radio station as high-profile guests within this musical genre.

He is a Lay Reader in the Church of England.

Musical works

Cantatas
 Jerusalem Joy (1975)
 Stargazers (1976) 
Updated edition (2017)
 David (1976) 
Updated edition (2004)
 A Grain of Mustard Seed (1976) 
Updated edition (2006)
 Saints Alive (1982)
 Apostle (1982)
Updated edition (2013)
 Greater than Gold (1983)
 From Pharaoh to Freedom (1985)
 While Shepherds Watched (1987)
 The Torn Curtain (1988)
 Away in a Manger (1989)
 Mary Magdalene (1990)
Additional lyrics by Horatius Bonar (1808–89), Cecil Frances Alexander (1823-95) and John Greenleaf Whittier (1807–82)
 Jairus' Daughter (1992)
Additional words by Sylvia Bunting and Chris Ellis
Hymn lyrics by Walter John Mathams (1853-1931)
 Angel Voices (1993)
 Pharisee (1996)
With other words by Alison Fuggle and Charles Wesley (1707–88)
 Simeon (1997)
 Snakes & Ladders (1999)
Lyrics, narrations and poems by Alison Fuggle
Additional lyrics by Roger Jones and Cardinal John Henry Newman 
Opening music by Tim Jones
 Wildfire (2002)
Lyrics and Narrations by Alison Fuggle
Additional lyrics by Roger Jones, Samuel Crossman (1624–83) and Isaac Watts (1674-1748)
 Jail Break (2005)
Additional music by Tim Jones
Lyrics and Narrations by Alison Fuggle
Additional lyrics by Roger Jones, Mary Jones, James Grindlay Small (1817–88) and Charles Wesley (1707-88)
 The Inn Crowd (2007)
Lyrics and Narrations by Alison Fuggle
Additional lyrics by Roger Jones, Peter H Lawrence, Edith Margaret Gellibrand Reed (1885-1933) and Reginald Heber (1783-1836)
 Rock (2008)
Lyrics and narrative links by Alison Fuggle
Additional lyrics by Roger Jones, Augustus Toplady (1740–78), E Mote (1797-1874) and traditional
 Two Sisters and a Funeral (2010)
Three songs by Tim Jones
Lyrics and narrative links by Alison Fuggle
Additional lyrics by Roger Jones, Robert Grant (1779-1838), Samuel T. Francis (1834-1926) and Henry Francis Lyte (1793-1847)
 Barnabas (2015)
Lyrics and narrative links by Alison Fuggle
Additional lyrics by Roger Jones, J H Samis (1846-1919), William Whiting (1825-78) and Bishop Walsham How (1823–97) 
 
Hymns and Carols
 The Roger Jones Hymn Collection (1999) published by Kevin Mayhew Ltd 
(2014) Revised edition published by Christian Music Ministries
 The Roger Jones Psalm Collection
 The Roger Jones Christmas Collection (2001)
 The Roger Jones Song Collection
 Seasons & Reasons (2010) hymn collection in collaboration with Bishop Timothy Dudley-Smith
 Songs of Christmas

Books
 Worship Works (2013)  by Roger Jones, Annie Routley and Helen Pollard. Cartoons by Tim Stanyon. Paintings by Ruth Butler.
 Spirit Works (2017)  by  Roger Jones, Annie Routley and Helen Pollard. Edited by Helen Pollard.

Awards
 2018 Mary Jones Prize from the British and Foreign Bible Society for Greater than Gold

References

External links
Christian Music Ministries

1948 births
Living people
Composers of Christian music
English male composers
20th-century British composers
21st-century British composers
Alumni of Birmingham City University
20th-century British male musicians
21st-century British male musicians